The 2007 Mazda Champ Car Grand Prix of Portland was the fourth round of the 2007 Champ Car World Series Season.  It was held on June 10 at the Portland International Raceway, in Portland, Oregon.  It featured the first standing start in Champ Car history.  Sébastien Bourdais claimed the victory to make it three wins in four races this season.

Qualifying results

Rain on Saturday meant that the pole was effectively decided during the Qualification 1 session on Friday.  Robert Doornbos led the wet Saturday session to start second beside Justin Wilson.

Race

Despite worries about stalled cars and carnage, the first standing start in Champ Car history was executed perfectly as all 17 cars got away from the grid.  The race was notable for its lack of caution flags.  Only two cars failed to finished, with both Katherine Legge and Jan Heylen both running into problems just before the checkered flag.

Pole sitter Justin Wilson lead easily from the start.  Sébastien Bourdais was in fifth place as late as lap 25 after stretching his fuel economy.  By short-filling his fuel tank during his first pit stop, Sébastien Bourdais came out on track in second place and was then able to run faster than anyone else on the track, finally passing Wilson after the second pit stop.  Once in first, he easily drove away to his third consecutive victory and the 100th in Newman/Haas/Lanigan team history.

Caution flags
None

Notes

Championship standings after the race

Drivers' Championship standings

 Note: Only the top five positions are included.

Attendance
Attendance for the 3 day race weekend was 72,211 with approximately 30,000 people on hand for the Sunday Champ Car main event. This was lower than hoped for by Champ Car and the race organizers leaving the future of the Portland race in doubt as the race's contract with Champ Car expired after the 2007 race. This was the last Champ Car race held at Portland, as the 2008 race was not absorbed into the IndyCar schedule. On October 12, 2017, it was announced that the IndyCar series will return to Portland during the 2018 Labor Day holiday weekend - Aug 31-Sept. 2, 2018.

References

External links
 Full Weekend Times & Results
 Race Box Score
 Drivers Standings After Race

Portland, Oregon
Mazda Champ Car Grand Prix
Grand Prix of Portland
2007 in Portland, Oregon